The 2023 Akron Zips football team will represent the University of Akron as a member of the East Division of the Mid-American Conference (MAC) during the 2023 NCAA Division I FBS football season. Led by second-year head coach Joe Moorhead, the Zips play home games at InfoCision Stadium in Akron, Ohio.

Previous season

The Falcons finished the 2022 season 2–10 and 1–7 in the MAC to in sixth place in the East Division.

Schedule

References

Akron
Akron Zips football seasons
Akron Zips football